The Nook may refer to:

The Nook, Shropshire, a United Kingdom location
The Nook, Isle of Man, an element of race courses
The Nook (Spring Garden Township, Pennsylvania), a historic home